West Fork Township may refer to:

West Fork Township, Washington County, Arkansas
West Fork Township, Franklin County, Iowa
West Fork Township, Monona County, Iowa